Wamberal Lagoon, an intermittently closed intermediate saline coastal lagoon, is located on the Central Coast region of New South Wales, Australia.

Features and location
Its outflow is to the Tasman Sea of the South Pacific Ocean that is generally closed, and water levels inside the lagoon are not usually influenced by ocean tides.

The lagoon and the surrounding land comprising  form part of the Wamberal Lagoon Nature Reserve, a nature reserve created in 1981, that is under management of the NSW National Parks & Wildlife Service.

Terrigal Lagoon and Avoca Lake are located to the south and are a short distance away.

Wamberal Lagoon Conservation Society

Formed in 1983 and still active, the Wamberal Lagoon Conservation Society (WLCS) was set up to promote conservation of the lagoon and its surrounds in the face of increasing urban development.

The initial charter of the WLCS cited the terms of Section 49(3) of the National Parks and Wildlife Act: lands within a nature reserve shall be deemed to be dedicated for the purposes of:
 (a) The care, propagation, preservation and conservation of wildlife;
 (b) The care, preservation and conservation of natural environments and natural phenomena.
 (c) The study of wildlife, natural environments and natural phenomena; and
 (d) The promotion of the appreciation and enjoyment of wildlife, natural environments and natural phenomena.

To this end the Society engages in education, co-operation with other bodies having a similar interest, and representations to authorities whose responsibilities affect the nature reserve. Members of the WLCS have been active members in bushcare activities over many years, involving removal of rubbish and invasive plants from environmentally sensitive areas, and replanting of native vegetation.

In 2018 and 2019 the WLCS initiated a habitat restoration project aimed at improving water quality in inflows to the lagoon, with the ultimate aim of reintroducing an endangered amphibian species (the green and golden bell frog, Litoria aurea) that once was common in this area but has been extirpated (as it has over most of its former range).

The WLCS is working with management authorities (notably, the NSW National Parks & Wildlife Service and the Central Coast Council) to identify practicable methods to reduce pollutant input (e.g., via Gross Pollutant Traps on waterways flowing into the lagoon) and to replace invasive weeds with native vegetation to enhance biodiversity.

As part of the habitat restoration initiative, WLCS assembled a list of vertebrate species that have been recorded to occur within one kilometre of the lagoon, based on unpublished records by WLCS members as well as consultancy reports. That list confirms the highly biodiverse nature of the site, and hence the importance of its conservation. Species lists below.

Amphibians

Birds

FISH

MAMMALS

REPTILES

See also

 List of lakes of Australia

References

External links
 
 
 

Lagoons of Australia
Coastline of New South Wales
Central Coast (New South Wales)
Lakes of New South Wales